The Global Junior Heavyweight League is a professional wrestling round-robin tournament held by Pro Wrestling Noah. The purpose of the tournament is to determine the promotion's top junior heavyweight wrestler. It was originally designed to be an annual event starting in 2009, but the second tournament did not take place until 2015. The tournament is a two-block round-robin tournament, much like New Japan Pro-Wrestling's Best of the Super Juniors tournament, in which each block's two highest scorers face off in the semifinals. A victory is worth two points, a draw was worth one, and a loss zero; each match has a thirty-minute time limit. Being a professional wrestling tournament, the outcome of the matches and the tournament itself are not determined through pure athletic competition but through pre-determined outcomes to matches.

List of winners

Global Junior Heavyweight League 
2009: Yoshinobu Kanemaru
2015: Daisuke Harada
2018: Kotaro Suzuki
2019: Hayata
2020: Daisuke Harada (2)

Jr. Rumble 

 2020: Atsushi Kotoge
 2021: Hayata (2)
 2022: Daisuke Harada (3)

2009
The first tournament, named simply Junior Heavyweight League, was held from October 15 to October 31 over nine shows, and featured two blocks of five. Foreign participation included Delirious from Ring of Honor and Jyushin Thunder Liger from New Japan Pro-Wrestling. The winner, Yoshinobu Kanemaru, also won the vacant GHC Junior Heavyweight Championship. Delirious was awarded place in the semifinal because original block A runner-up Kotaro Suzuki had to withdraw with a flu.

2015
The second tournament, now named Global Junior Heavyweight League, took place from July 18 to August 5, 2015.

2018
The third tournament took place from September 8 to October 4, 2018.

2019
The fourth Global Junior Heavyweight League took place from June 27 to July 27, 2019.

2020
The 2020 Global Junior Heavyweight League, featuring 4 blocks took place between January 10 and January 30.

2020 (Rumble) 
After the COVID-19 pandemic, the Junior Heavyweight League was replaced with an annual Junior Rumble. The first edition was on 4 October as part of an N-1 Victory 2020 show at Korakuen Hall in Bunkyō, Tokyo and contained 14 participants. They entered strictly every 30 seconds. The winner of this rumble did not receive a GHC Junior Heavyweight Championship shot and the reigning champion, Kotaro Suzuki, participated.

2021 
The 2021 Noah Junior Rumble was held in an empty Club Citta, Kawasaki, Kanagawa on 26 June, one month before the Noah Jr. Team Game 2021. It was part of Noah Cage War 2021. The Rumble had 15 participants, 1 more than the previous year. The winner, Hayata, successfully defeated Atsushi Kotoge for the GHC Junior Heavyweight Championship the next night.

Haoh, Tadasuke and Nioh all entered at the same time. Hayata & Yoshinari Ogawa entered unofficially and were allowed entry by the referee.

2022 
The 2022 Noah Junior Rumble was part of the N Innovation U-Cup. It was held at Yokohama Radiant Hall, Yokohama on 6 January. Daisuke Harada, the winner, successfully defeated Hayata for the GHC Junior Heavyweight Championship the next night.

References 

Pro Wrestling Noah
Pro Wrestling Noah tournaments
Pro Wrestling Noah shows